Talvez se chame Saudade is a compilation of fados by Portuguese fado singer Mafalda Arnauth, released in 2005 on EMI Music Portugal.

Track listing
 Meus Lindos Olhos
 Quase Imortal
 Bendito Fado, Bendita Gente
 Pode Lá Ser
 Esta Voz Que Me Atravessa
 Talvez Se Chame Saudade
 Serás Sempre Lisboa
 Lusitana
 O Sol Chama Por Mim
 As Fontes
 Cavalo À Solta
 Da Palma Da Minha Mão
 Este Silêncio Que Me Corta
 Coisa Assim
 Eu Venho
 Até Logo, Meu Amor

Personnel
 Masterized in Studios Tcha Tcha Tcha by Rui Dias
 Cover Note: João Miguel Tavares
 Selection: David Ferreira, Aldina Duarte e Paula Freitas
 Design: Sérgio Bernardo
 Photography: Isabel Pinto

2005 compilation albums
Mafalda Arnauth albums